Boston College Law School (BC Law) is the law school of Boston College. It is situated on a  wooded campus in Newton, Massachusetts, about 1.5 miles from the university's main campus in Chestnut Hill, Massachusetts.

With approximately 800 students and 60 full-time faculty members distinguished for scholarly research, BC Law is consistently ranked in the top-tier of law schools in the United States. In 2021, U.S. News & World Report ranked BC Law as the #29 law school in the nation. The school's small size and prestige make admission highly selective. Reflecting its Roman Catholic (Jesuit) heritage, BC Law has established programs in human rights, social justice and public interest law, as well as programs in business law and innovation, law and public policy and criminal and civil litigation. Its faculty played a part in arguing for the repeal of the Solomon Amendment, presenting oral arguments before the United States Supreme Court in Rumsfeld v. FAIR.

According to BC Law's 2021 American Bar Association (ABA)-required disclosures, 90.2% of the Class of 2020 obtained full-time, long-term, JD-required or advantage employment ten months after graduation. For 2021, the acceptance rate was 23.49%, with 22.79% of accepted students enrolling, with an average LSAT score of 165, and with an average GPA of 3.69.

History
Although provisions for a law school were included in Boston College's original charter, ratified by the General Court of the Commonwealth of Massachusetts in 1863, Boston College Law School was formally organized later in 1929. Previously, promising Boston College graduates interested in a legal education were encouraged to seek admission to Harvard Law School, as attested by the law school's inaugural faculty of whom 11 out of 17 members held degrees from both universities. BC Law's founder, John B. Creeden, formerly president of Georgetown University, served as its first regent and alumnus Dennis A. Dooley as its first dean.

On September 26, 1929, BC Law opened its doors in the 11-story Lawyer’s Building on Beacon Street opposite the Massachusetts State House in downtown Boston. From a pool of nearly 700 applicants, 102 day and evening division students had been selected. So rigorous were the school's academic standards that 50% of the first class eventually dropped out or flunked out. However, just three years later, the school received American Bar Association accreditation, joining Harvard, Yale, and Boston University as the only law schools in New England to attain that distinction; accreditation by the Association of American Law Schools followed in 1937.

Women were admitted to the school by 1940, when enrollment had surpassed 350 students. In 1954, the school moved to St. Thomas More Hall on the edge of the main Chestnut Hill campus and to its present  Newton campus, the home of the former Newton College of the Sacred Heart, in 1975. Today, the law campus includes Stuart House, an administrative building; lecture halls; seminar spaces; a dining hall; conference space; and a law library that includes the Daniel R. Coquillette Rare Book Room.

Academics

Curriculum

BC Law offers a first-year law program that includes constitutional and criminal law, civil procedure, contracts, property, and torts, as well as a two-semester legal reasoning, research, and writing course called Law Practice, which provides three experiential learning credits and a foundation in critical thinking, analysis, and communication. There is also a 1L experiential-based elective in the spring semester. The School offers programs abroad through the Semester-in-Practice International Program primarily based in Dublin and exchange programs with Bucerius Law School, Paris HEAD Law School, and Renmin University in China.  The law school also has exchange programs with Bucerius Law School, the Pontificia Universidad Católica Argentina, and numerous other law faculties throughout the world.

Law reviews
Boston College Law School has two main, student-run publications: Boston College Law Review (BCLR) and the Uniform Commercial Code Reporter-Digest (UCC Reporter-Digest). In Spring 2017, the Boston College Environmental Affairs Law Review,  Boston College International and Comparative Law Review, and the Journal of Law and Social Justice published their last issues and consolidated into the Boston College Law Review.

The Boston College Law Review is the Law School's main flagship journal and was ranked 20th in the 2019 Washington & Lee Law Review Rankings, the highest ranking in its history. Starting in Fall 2017, it publishes eight issues per year. It endeavors to publish high-quality pieces written by students and scholars on a wide variety of legal issues.

The Uniform Commercial Code Reporter-Digest is published by Matthew Bender & Company, a division of LexisNexis. It provides annotations on numerous cases relating to the Uniform Commercial Code, thereby serving as a helpful research tool.

BC Law also maintains an online publication, the Intellectual Property and Technology Forum, covering issues of copyright, trademark and patent law.

Libraries
Opened in 1996 at a cost of $11.7 million, the 84,500-square-foot Law Library building was designed by the Boston firm of Earl R. Flansburgh & Associates and contains four levels organized in four wings around a unifying central atrium. It houses 500,000 print volumes covering all major areas of American law and primary legal materials from the federal government, Canada, United Kingdom, United Nations, and European Union. The library also features a substantial electronic volumes offering, treatise and periodical collection and a growing collection of international and comparative law material. The library's Coquillette Rare Book Room houses works from the fifteenth through nineteenth centuries, including works by and about Saint Thomas More. It also contains a marble fireplace mantel that once adorned the East Room of the White House.

Research centers and institutes

Center for Human Rights and International Justice
Business Institute, Boston College
Center for Asset Management
Center for Corporate Citizenship (CCC)
Center for East Europe, Russia and Asia
Center for Ignatian Spirituality
Center for International Higher Education
Center For Investment Research And Management
Institute for the Study and Promotion of Race and Culture (ISPRC)
International Study Center
Irish Institute
Jesuit Institute
The Rappaport Center for Law and Public Policy
Small Business Development Center
Urban Ecology Institute
Winston Center for Leadership and Ethics
Women's Resource Center

Rankings
Ranking Summary:
Above the Law 2020: 22nd;
U.S. News & World Report 2022: 29th;
National Law Journal Go-To Law Schools: 19th;
Washington & Lee Law Review Rankings: 20th.

Due to BC Law faculty reputations as teachers and mentors among students, the Princeton Review law rankings placed BC Law in the #7 position for "Best Professors". BC Law is also ranked #10 for "Best Quality of Life." In 2019, Above The Law, a legal blog that focuses on BigLaw, ranked BC Law 22nd overall in the country.

Since 2007, the National Law Journal has ranked BC Law in the top 20 law schools due to the large number of graduates the school places in top American law firms. Harvard was the only other Boston area law school that placed in the top 20 for recruiting.

The U.S. News & World Report's 2021 law school rankings placed BC Law 29th in the country. For 2023 the ranking was 37th in the country. The magazine ranked BC Law's tax program 14th in the nation, its environmental law program 27th, and its legal writing program 29th.

Employment 
According to BC Law's 2021 ABA-required disclosures, 90.2% of the Class of 2020 obtained full-time, long-term, JD-required or advantage employment ten months after graduation (at least eight Class of 2020 BC Law graduates secured employment between 03/15/2021 and 04/07/2021. If these graduates had been counted, percent employment would be 93.5%). BC Law's Law School Transparency under-employment score is 14.2%, indicating the percentage of the Class of 2020 unemployed, pursuing an additional degree, or working in a non-professional, short-term, or part-time job nine months after graduation.

For BC Law graduates, median private sector starting salary is $190,000, and the median public service starting salary is $62,500, based on self-reporting data.

Costs
The total cost of attendance (indicating the cost of tuition, fees, and living expenses) at BC Law for incoming students in the 2019-2020 academic year is $79,473. The Law School Transparency estimated debt-financed cost of attendance for three years is $301,402.

Nickname
In a nod towards the nickname of Boston College athletics teams, the term "Legal Eagle" is sometimes used to refer to students and alumni of Boston College Law School.

Noted people
Arthur Berney (born 1930), Boston College Law School Professor Emeritus
Edward P. Boland, JD 1936, United States Congressman from Massachusetts; author of the Boland Amendment
Garrett J. Bradley, JD 1995, member of the Massachusetts House of Representatives (2000–2016)
Scott Brown, JD 1985, United States Ambassador to New Zealand and Samoa (2017–2020); United States Senator from Massachusetts (2010–2013)
William M. Bulger, JD 1961, President of the University of Massachusetts System (1996–2003); President of the Massachusetts Senate (1978–1996)
Thomas Capano, JD 1973, former Deputy Attorney General of Delaware; convicted murderer
Mike Capuano, JD 1977, United States Congressman from Massachusetts (1999–2019); Mayor of Somerville, Massachusetts (1990–1999)
J. W. Carney Jr., JD 1978, criminal defense attorney
Paul Cellucci, JD 1973, United States Ambassador to Canada (2001–2005); Governor of Massachusetts (1999–2001); Lieutenant Governor of Massachusetts (1991–1999)
James A. Champy, JD 1968, organizational theorist, known for his work in the field of business process reengineering, business process improvement, and organizational change
Robert W. Clifford, JD 1962, Associate Justice, Maine Supreme Judicial Court (1986–2009)
Silvio O. Conte, JD 1949, United States Congressman from Massachusetts (1959–1991); member of the Massachusetts Senate (1951–1959)
Mike Connolly, JD 2009, member of the Massachusetts House of Representatives (2017–present)
Thomas A. Cox, Jr., JD 1987, Judge, Superior Court of Fulton County, Georgia (2017–present)
Bill Delahunt, JD 1967, United States Congressman from Massachusetts (1997–2011); District Attorney, Norfolk County, Massachusetts (1975–1997)
John Dooley, LLB 1968, Associate Justice, Vermont Supreme Court (1987–2017)
Robert Downes, JD 1968, Judge, Superior Court of Alaska, Fourth District (2005–2012) 
James B. Eldridge, JD 2000, member of the Massachusetts Senate (2009–present); member Massachusetts House of Representatives (2003–2008)
Frank Galvin, JD 1952, fictional alumnus, main character in the film The Verdict, portrayed by Paul Newman
Michael S. Greco, JD 1972, President, American Bar Association (2006–2007)
Elizabeth L. Gunn, JD 2005, Judge, United States Bankruptcy Court for the District of Columbia (2020–present)
Margaret Heckler, JD 1956, United States Congresswoman; United States Secretary of Health and Human Services; United States Ambassador to Ireland
Philip H. Hilder, JD 1981, former attorney-in-charge of the United States Department of Justice's Houston office of Organized Crime Strike Force (1987–1990)
Paul Hodes, JD 1978, United States Congressman from New Hampshire (2007–2011)
Jared Huffman, JD 1990, United States Congressman from California (2013–present); former member of the California State Assembly (2006–2012)
Thomas E. Humphrey, JD 1972, Associate Justice, Maine Supreme Judicial Court (2015–present)
Ellen Segal Huvelle, JD 1975, Judge, United States District Court for the District of Columbia (1999–present); Associate Judge, Superior Court of the District of Columbia (1990–1999)
Cameron Kerry, JD 1978, General Counsel of the United States Department of Commerce (2009–2013), acting United States Secretary of Commerce (2013)
John Kerry, JD 1976, United States Secretary of State (2013–2017), United States Senator (1985–2013), 2004 Democratic candidate for President of the United States
Kerry Kennedy, JD, human rights activist, writer and daughter of Robert F. Kennedy
Erik P. Kimball, JD 1990, Judge, United States Bankruptcy Court for the Southern District of Florida
Leslie E. Kobayashi, JD 1983, Judge, United States District Court for the District of Hawaii (2010–present)
William Landay, novelist
Myles Lane, JD 1938, Justice, New York Supreme Court (1968–1979); professional ice hockey player; college football player and coach
Sandy N. Leal, JD 1989, Judge, Orange County Superior Court (2018–present)
Bernard J. Leddy, LLB 1934, Judge, United States District Court for the District of Vermont (1966–1972)
David Linsky, JD 1982, member of the Massachusetts House of Representatives (1999–present)
Christopher Liwski, Canadian American rower, a six-time U.S. National Team member, a double world championship medal winner, and a two-time member of the U.S. Olympic Rowing Team
Mark Longietti, JD 1988, member of the Pennsylvania House of Representatives (2007–present)
Paul Loscocco, JD 1987, member of the Massachusetts House of Representatives (2001–2009)
Frank Lowenstein, JD 1997, United States Special Envoy for Middle East Peace (2013; 2014–2017)
Stephen F. Lynch, JD 1991, United States Congressman (2001–present)
Dan Malloy, JD 1977, Chancellor of the University of Maine System (2019–present), former Governor of Connecticut (2011–2019), former Mayor of Stamford, Connecticut (1995–2009)
Ed Markey, JD 1972, United States Senator (2013–present), United States Congressman (1976–2013)
Shannon Miller, JD 2007, Olympic gymnast
Lara Montecalvo, JD 2000, Judge of the United States Court of Appeals for the First Circuit
Marilyn Mosby, JD 2007, State Attorney for City of Baltimore (2014–present)
Cammy Myler, JD 2001, 4-time Winter Olympian
Francis Patrick O'Connor, JD 1953, Associate Justice, Massachusetts Supreme Judicial Court
William Orrick III, JD 1979, Judge, United States District Court for the Northern District of California (2013–present)
Charles Redding Pitt, JD 1977, U.S. Attorney for the Middle District of Alabama (1994–2001)
Grier Raggio, JD 1968, Democratic candidate in 32nd congressional district of Texas
James A. Redden LLB 1954, Judge, United States District Court for the District of Oregon (1980–2020); former Attorney General and State Treasurer of Oregon
Charles E. Rice JD 1956, author, legal scholar, and professor of law
Thomas Reilly JD 1970, Attorney General of Massachusetts (1999–2007), 2006 Massachusetts gubernatorial candidate
William P. Robinson III, JD 1975, Associate Justice, Rhode Island Supreme Court (2004–present)
Leon Rodriguez, JD 1988, Director, DHS, U.S Citizenship and Immigration Services (2014–2017); Director, Department of Health and Human Services, Office for Civil Rights (2011–2014)
Manuel Rodríguez Orellana JD 1975, Author (memoir), Professor of Law (retired), Puerto Rican Independence Party (Senator 2000)
Warren Rudman, JD 1960, United States Senator from New Hampshire (1980–1993); Attorney General of New Hampshire (1970–1976)
Larry Ruttman, JD 1958, author
Marian T. Ryan, JD 1979, District Attorney, Middlesex County, Massachusetts (2013–present)
Thomas Salmon, JD 1957, Governor of Vermont (1973–1977)
Bobby Scott, JD 1973, United States Congressman from Virginia (1993–present)
Francis X. Spina, JD 1971, Associate Justice, Massachusetts Supreme Judicial Court (1999–2016)
Michael A. Sullivan, JD 1985, Mayor of Cambridge, Massachusetts
Richard Thompson, member of the Maine House of Representatives (1994–2000)
Patric Verrone, JD 1984, President of the Writers Guild of America West
Kevin White, LLB 1955, Mayor of Boston, Massachusetts (1968–1984)
Diane Wilkerson, JD 1981, first African-American member of the  Massachusetts Senate (1993–2008)
Debra Wong Yang, JD 1984, United States Attorney for the Central District of California (2002–2006)
Gerald T. Zerkin, JD 1976, Federal Public Defender for Zacarias Moussaoui

See also
List of Boston College people
Presidents of Boston College

References

External links

 

Law
Catholic law schools in the United States
Educational institutions established in 1929
Gothic Revival architecture in Massachusetts
Jesuit universities and colleges in the United States
Law schools in Massachusetts
Catholic universities and colleges in Massachusetts
Universities and colleges in Newton, Massachusetts
1929 establishments in Massachusetts